In geometry and polyhedral combinatorics, a -neighborly polytope is a convex polytope in which every set of  or fewer vertices forms a face. A -simplex is -neighborly.

The cyclic polytopes formed as the convex hulls of finite sets of points on the moment curve  in -dimensional space are automatically neighborly. Theodore Motzkin conjectured that all neighborly polytopes are combinatorially equivalent to cyclic polytopes. However, contrary to this conjecture, there are many neighborly polytopes that are not cyclic: the number of combinatorially distinct neighborly polytopes grows superexponentially, both in the number of vertices of the polytope and in the dimension.

The convex hull of a set of random points, drawn from a Gaussian distribution with the number of points proportional to the dimension, is with high probability -neighborly for a value  that is also proportional to the dimension.

The number of faces of all dimensions of a neighborly polytope in an even number of dimensions is determined solely from its dimension and its number of vertices by the Dehn–Sommerville equations: the number of -dimensional faces, satisfies the inequality

A generalized version of the happy ending problem applies to higher-dimensional point sets, and implies that for every dimension  and every  there exists a number  with the property that every  points in general position in -dimensional space contain a subset of  points that form the vertices of a neighborly polytope.

References

Polyhedral combinatorics